The family Vangidae (from vanga, Malagasy for the hook-billed vanga, Vanga curvirostris) comprises a group of often shrike-like medium-sized birds distributed from Asia to Africa, including the vangas of Madagascar to which the family owes its name. Many species in this family were previously classified elsewhere in other families. Recent molecular techniques made it possible to assign these species to Vangidae, thereby solving several taxonomic enigmas.

Taxonomy 
In addition to the small set of Malagasy species traditionally called the vangas, Vangidae includes some Asian groups: the woodshrikes (Tephrodornis), flycatcher-shrikes (Hemipus) and philentomas.

Vangidae belongs to a clade of corvid birds that also includes bushshrikes (Malaconotidae), ioras (Aegithinidae) and the Australian butcherbirds, magpies and currawongs (Cracticidae) and woodswallows (Artamidae), which has been defined as the superfamily Malaconotoidea. They seem closely related to some enigmatic African groups: the helmetshrikes (Prionops) and the shrike-flycatchers (Bias and Megabyas). 
 
On Madagascar, vangas were traditionally believed to be a small family of shrike-like birds. Recent research suggests that several Madagascan taxa most similar in appearance and habits (and formerly considered to be) Old World warblers, Old World flycatchers or Old World babblers may be vangas. Yamagishi et al. found in 2001 that Newtonia appeared to belong with the vangas rather than the warblers and also that Tylas was a vanga and not a bulbul. It also appears that Ward's flycatcher and Crossley's babbler belong with the vangas.

Description 
The vangas are an example of adaptive radiation, having evolved from a single founding population into a variety of forms adapted to various niches occupied by other bird families in other parts of the world. They differ in size, colour and bill shape but are similar in skull shape and bony palate structure. They are small to medium-sized birds, varying from 12 to 32 cm in length. Many have strong, hooked bills similar to those of shrikes. The helmet vanga has a particularly large bill with a casque on top. Other species, such as the newtonias, have a small, thin bill. The sickle-billed vanga is notable for its long, curved bill used to probe into holes and cracks.

Most vangas are largely black, brown or grey above and white below. Exceptions include the blue and white blue vanga and the blue-grey nuthatch vanga. The helmet vanga is mostly black with a rufous back. Male Bernier's vangas are entirely black while the females are brown. It is one of several species with distinct male and female plumage while in other species the sexes are identical.

Most vangas have whistling calls.

Distribution and habitat 
All vangas are endemic to Madagascar apart from the blue vanga, which also occurs in the Comoros on Mohéli island and, at least formerly, on Grande Comore. They are found throughout Madagascar, in a variety of forest and scrub habitats. Several species including Van Dam's vanga and sickle-billed vanga can be found in the dry deciduous forests in the west of the island. Some such as Crossley's babbler, helmet vanga and Bernier's vanga are restricted to rainforest in the east of the island. Lafresnaye's vanga and the recently discovered red-shouldered vanga occur in subarid thorn scrub in the south-west.

Behaviour 

Their diet can include insects, earthworms, millipedes, lizards and amphibians. The blue vanga and chabert vanga occasionally eat fruit. Many species feed in small groups, often in mixed-species foraging flocks. The hook-billed vanga and Lafresnaye's vanga tend to forage alone. Vangas have a variety of different foraging strategies. Many species glean food as they move through the branches. The nuthatch vanga climbs up trunks and branches like a nuthatch but does not climb downwards as nuthatches do. Crossley's babbler forages by walking along the forest floor amongst the leaf litter. The chabert vanga and the tylas vanga often fly into the air to catch prey. The three Xenopirostris vangas use their laterally flattened bills to strip bark off trees to search for food underneath.

Most species nest in pairs, building cup-shaped nests using twigs, bark, roots and leaves. The sickle-billed vanga nests in groups and builds a large nest of sticks.

Status and conservation 
Some species of vanga are common such as the chabert vanga which can survive in secondary woodland and plantations of introduced trees. Several other species are threatened by loss of their forest habitat. Pollen's vanga is classed as near-threatened by BirdLife International and the red-shouldered vanga, Bernier's vanga, helmet vanga and red-tailed newtonia are regarded as vulnerable. Van Dam's vanga is classed as endangered because it is restricted to a small area of north-west Madagascar where the forest is rapidly disappearing due to clearance for agriculture and uncontrolled bushfires.

Species list 

FAMILY: VANGIDAE
 Genus: Calicalicus
 Red-tailed vanga, Calicalicus madagascariensis
 Red-shouldered vanga, Calicalicus rufocarpalis
 Genus: Schetba
 Rufous vanga, Schetba rufa
 Genus: Vanga
 Hook-billed vanga, Vanga curvirostris
 Genus: Xenopirostris
 Lafresnaye's vanga, Xenopirostris xenopirostris
 Van Dam's vanga, Xenopirostris damii
 Pollen's vanga, Xenopirostris polleni
 Genus: Falculea
 Sickle-billed vanga, Falculea palliata
 Genus: Artamella
 White-headed vanga, Artamella viridis
 Genus: Leptopterus
 Chabert vanga, Leptopterus chabert
 Genus: Cyanolanius
 Madagascar blue vanga, Cyanolanius madagascarinus
 Comoros blue vanga, Cyanolanius comorensis.
 Genus: Oriolia
 Bernier's vanga, Oriolia bernieri
 Genus: Euryceros
 Helmet vanga, Euryceros prevostii
 Genus: Tylas
 Tylas vanga, Tylas eduardi
 Genus: Hypositta
 Nuthatch vanga or coral-billed nuthatch vanga, Hypositta corallirostris
 Genus: Newtonia
Northern dark newtonia, Newtonia amphichroa
Southern dark newtonia, Newtonia lavarambo (sometimes considered a subspecies of N. amphicroa)
Common newtonia, Newtonia brunneicauda
Archbold's newtonia, Newtonia archboldi
Red-tailed newtonia, Newtonia fanovanae
 Genus: Prionops
 Yellow-crested helmetshrike, Prionops alberti
 Red-billed helmetshrike, Prionops caniceps
 Rufous-bellied helmetshrike, Prionops rufiventris
 Gabela helmetshrike, Prionops gabela
 White-crested helmetshrike, Prionops plumatus
 Grey-crested helmetshrike, Prionops poliolophus
 Retz's helmetshrike, Prionops retzii
 Chestnut-fronted helmetshrike, Prionops scopifrons
 Genus: Mystacornis
 Crossley's babbler, Mystacornis crossleyi
 Genus: Bias
 Black-and-white shrike-flycatcher, Bias musicus
 Genus: Megabyas
 African shrike-flycatcher, Megabyas flammulatus
 Genus: Hemipus
 Black-winged flycatcher-shrike, Hemipus hirundinaceus
 Bar-winged flycatcher-shrike, Hemipus picatus
 Genus: Tephrodornis
 Large woodshrike, Tephrodornis gularis
 Malabar woodshrike, Tephrodornis sylvicola
 Common woodshrike, Tephrodornis pondicerianus
 Sri Lanka woodshrike, Tephrodornis affinis
 Genus: Philentoma
 Rufous-winged philentoma, Philentoma pyrhoptera
 Maroon-breasted philentoma, Philentoma velata
 Genus: Pseudobias
 Ward's flycatcher, Pseudobias wardi

References

External links 

 Vanga videos on the Internet Bird Collection
 Vangas, Bird Families of the World